The Crosley–Garrett Mill Workers' Housing, Store, and Mill Site, also known as Paper Mill House and the William Crosley Store and Mill Workers' House, is a historic mill-related complex located on Darby Creek in Newtown Township, Delaware County, Pennsylvania.  The complex consists of a four-family stone Workers' Housing unit (1828), with an attached store (1845), and the archaeological remains of William Crosley's Woolen Mill (1828-1861) and Casper S. Garrett's Union Paper Mill (1869-1889).

The buildings house the Paper Mill House Museum and headquarters of the Newtown Square Historical Society.

It was added to the National Register of Historic Places in 2003.

References

External links
Newtown Square Historical Society website

Historic house museums in Pennsylvania
Houses on the National Register of Historic Places in Pennsylvania
Archaeological sites on the National Register of Historic Places in Pennsylvania
Federal architecture in Pennsylvania
Residential buildings completed in 1828
Museums in Delaware County, Pennsylvania
Houses in Delaware County, Pennsylvania
National Register of Historic Places in Delaware County, Pennsylvania
1828 establishments in Pennsylvania
Company housing